The 12887 / 88 Howrah–Puri Express is a Superfast Express train belonging to Indian Railways – South Eastern Railway zone that runs between  and  in India.

It operates as train number 12887 from Howrah Junction to Puri and as train number 12888 in the reverse direction, serving the states of West Bengal and Odisha.

Coaches

The 12887 / 88 Howrah–Puri Express has 1 AC 2 tier, 5 AC 3 tier, 8 Sleeper class, 5 General Unreserved, 1 Pantry car, 1 SLR (Seating cum Luggage Rake) & 1 EOG ( End on Generation) coaches.

As is customary with most train services in India, coach composition may be amended at the discretion of Indian Railways depending on demand.

Service

As the average speed of the train is above , as per Indian Railways rules, its fare includes a Superfast surcharge.

Routeing

Traction

As the route is fully electrified, a -based WAP-4 powers the train for its entire journey.

Operation

12888 Puri–Howrah Express runs from Puri every Sunday, reaching Howrah Junction the next day .

12887 Howrah–Puri Express runs from Howrah Junction every Monday, reaching Puri the next day  .

References 

 http://www.holidayiq.com/railways/howrah-puri-express-12887-train.html
 http://www.ser.indianrailways.gov.in/view_detail.jsp?lang=0&dcd=409&id=0,4,423
 http://news.webindia123.com/news/articles/India/20130410/2186643.html

External links

Rail transport in Howrah
Transport in Puri
Express trains in India
Rail transport in West Bengal
Rail transport in Odisha